The 2007 Scheldeprijs cycling race took place on April 18, 2007.

In the 95th running of the Scheldeprijs. Mark Cavendish beat Robbie McEwen and Gert Steegmans in a bunch sprint to take his first professional win.

Results

References

2007
Scheldeprijs
Scheldeprijs